The Otemma Glacier is a  long glacier (2005) situated in the Pennine Alps in the canton of Valais in Switzerland. By 2010 it had receded a further  from its 1973 position. In summer 2018,  the snout zone (terminus) of the glacier collapsed.

See also
List of glaciers in Switzerland
List of glaciers
Retreat of glaciers since 1850
Swiss Alps

References

External links
Swiss glacier monitoring network

Glaciers of Valais
Glaciers of the Alps